Scotura abstracta is a moth of the family Notodontidae. It is found in Guyana.

References

Moths described in 1918
Notodontidae of South America